Ollen Bruton Smith (March 3, 1927 – June 22, 2022) was a promoter and owner/CEO of NASCAR track owner Speedway Motorsports, Inc. He was inducted into NASCAR Hall of Fame in 2016 and the International Motorsports Hall of Fame in 2007. He was billionaire on the Forbes 400 list.

Background and personal life
Smith was born in Oakboro, North Carolina, and watched his first race as an eight-year-old. He bought his first race car at 17. He began promoting stock car events as an 18-year-old at Midland, North Carolina.  He claims that he beat NASCAR legends Buck Baker and Joe Weatherly. He quit racing because his mother wanted him to quit.

Smith was divorced with four children. He died on June 22, 2022, at the age of 95.

Business involvement

NSCRA
In 1949, Smith took over the National Stock Car Racing Association (NSCRA), one of several fledgling stock-car sanctioning bodies and a direct competitor to the recently founded NASCAR, and announced that the series, which sanctioned races across Tennessee, Georgia and North Carolina, would establish a "Strictly Stock" division that year; some believe this caused Bill France, Sr., NASCAR's founder, to accelerate his plans for his own Strictly Stock division, which would later become Winston Cup Series and is now known as the NASCAR Cup Series; it also touched off a rivalry between Smith and the France family.

In 1950, Smith took over a lease of Charlotte Speedway from Buck Baker, Roby Combs and Ike Kaiser to promote races there. The same year, France and Smith discussed merging their sanctioning bodies, and came to a tentative agreement on the issue; however, Smith was drafted into the United States Army to fight in the Korean War in January 1951, becoming a paratrooper. When Smith returned to civilian life two years later, he found that mismanagement in his absence had caused NSCRA to dissolve.

Speedway Motorsports
Smith built Charlotte Motor Speedway in 1959 for $1.5 million, with financing from his wealthy brother-in-law. Racer Curtis Turner helped with promoting the track. Smith went bankrupt two years later. The track was turned over by Judge J.B. Craven to local furniture store owner Richard Howard, who ran the track and worked it out of its debts (the mortgage was burned publicly in 1967) while Smith moved to Illinois, eventually buying out other shares of stock in the track to regain control in the early 1970s.

He later founded Speedway Motorsports, Inc. (SMI), which owns eight NASCAR tracks that host twelve NASCAR Sprint Cup events. Speedway Motorsports owns Charlotte Motor Speedway, Atlanta Motor Speedway, Bristol Motor Speedway, Sonoma Raceway, Kentucky Speedway, Las Vegas Motor Speedway, New Hampshire Motor Speedway, and Texas Motor Speedway. The NASCAR All-Star Race is also held annually at SMI tracks. From 1985 to 2019 it was held at Charlotte Motor speedway, with the exception of 1986 when it was held at Atlanta Motor Speedway. Bristol Motor Speedway held it once in 2020, and Texas Motor speedway has held it since. He shook up the motorsports world in 1995 when he took the company public and traded it at the New York Stock Exchange (NYSE). SMI was the first motorsports company traded at the NYSE.

Smith announced that he would return the Labor Day weekend NASCAR race from Auto Club Speedway in California (where it had been run since 2004) to the south beginning in 2009. His Atlanta track hosted the late summer holiday weekend event from 2009 until its final running on August 31, 2014. Beginning in 2015 the race returns to its longtime Labor Day home in Darlington, S.C., a track not owned by Smith's Speedway Motorsports, Inc. SMI's Atlanta Motor Speedway will host its only race of 2015 on March 1.

Charlotte Motor Speedway controversy
Controversy broke out in September/October 2007 when Smith revealed plans to build a drag racing strip on land close to Charlotte Motor Speedway.    On October 2, 2007, Smith   He said that he would be able to finish such a project with $350 million and 11 months.

On November 26, 2007, Smith announced his intent to retain Charlotte Motor Speedway in its current location in Concord. His decision was an apparent response to an incentive package offered by the city, county, and state, worth approximately $80 million. As part of the incentives, Speedway Boulevard was renamed to Bruton Smith Boulevard, and will be re-aligned or widened. The package includes three other major road projects near the speedway. Sources of funding for the projects are still under discussion, but could include a sales tax increase for local residents.

Smith founded Sonic Automotive, a group of 100 car dealerships across the United States.

Wealth and Philanthropy
Smith was ranked #207 on the Forbes 400 list with an estimated worth of $1.5 billion in 2005, and fell to #278 (worth an estimated $1.4 billion) in 2006. In 2012, Smith was classified by CNN Money as the oldest CEO of the Fortune 500.

Smith supported child-related causes with his charity Speedway Children's Charities. He additionally pledged $50 million toward a Lynx Rapid Transit Services light rail line that would have connected Charlotte Motor Speedway to Uptown Charlotte, while also passing near the original Charlotte Speedway (the site of NASCAR's first race). The LYNX line was part of Charlotte's successful bid to secure the NASCAR Hall of Fame. Ultimately, the city of Charlotte decided to end the line at UNC Charlotte, a few miles short of the speedway.

Awards
Smith was inducted in the International Motorsports Hall of Fame in 2007.
He was inducted in the North Carolina Business Hall of Fame in 2006.
He was inducted by the National Motorsports Press Association to the Stock Car Racing Hall of Fame in 2006.
Smith was inducted into the NASCAR Hall of Fame on January 23, 2016.

References
Citations

Bibliography

External links
Official website of Speedway Motorsports
Speedway Motorsports Company profile on Yahoo
Speedway Children's Charities
May 30, 2006 interview at NASCAR.com
 

1927 births
2022 deaths
People from Oakboro, North Carolina
Auto racing executives
American billionaires
American motorsport people
American businesspeople
NASCAR people
United States Army personnel of the Korean War
Paratroopers
NASCAR Hall of Fame inductees